Nikolsky (masculine), Nikolskaya (feminine), or Nikolskoye (neuter) is the name of several inhabited localities in Russia.

Modern localities

Altai Krai
As of 2010, three rural localities in Altai Krai bear this name:
Nikolsky, Altai Krai, a settlement in Borisovsky Selsoviet of Zalesovsky District
Nikolskoye, Altaysky District, Altai Krai, a selo in Kuyagansky Selsoviet of Altaysky District
Nikolskoye, Sovetsky District, Altai Krai, a selo in Nikolsky Selsoviet of Sovetsky District

Altai Republic
As of 2010, one rural locality in the Altai Republic bears this name:
Nikolskoye, Altai Republic, a selo in Karakokshinskoye Rural Settlement of Choysky District

Amur Oblast
As of 2010, one rural locality in Amur Oblast bears this name:
Nikolskoye, Amur Oblast, a selo in Nikolsky Rural Settlement of Belogorsky District

Arkhangelsk Oblast
As of 2010, five rural localities in Arkhangelsk Oblast bear this name:
Nikolskoye, Arkhangelsk Oblast, a village in Lisestrovsky Selsoviet of Primorsky District
Nikolskaya, Krasnoborsky District, Arkhangelsk Oblast, a village in Verkhneuftyugsky Selsoviet of Krasnoborsky District
Nikolskaya, Mikhaylovsky Selsoviet, Shenkursky District, Arkhangelsk Oblast, a village in Mikhaylovsky Selsoviet of Shenkursky District
Nikolskaya, Rovdinsky Selsoviet, Shenkursky District, Arkhangelsk Oblast, a village in Rovdinsky Selsoviet of Shenkursky District
Nikolskaya, Velsky District, Arkhangelsk Oblast, a village in Khozminsky Selsoviet of Velsky District

Astrakhan Oblast
As of 2010, two rural localities in Astrakhan Oblast bear this name:
Nikolskoye, Kamyzyaksky District, Astrakhan Oblast, a selo in Nikolo-Komarovsky Selsoviet of Kamyzyaksky District
Nikolskoye, Yenotayevsky District, Astrakhan Oblast, a selo in Nikolsky Selsoviet of Yenotayevsky District

Republic of Bashkortostan
As of 2010, nine rural localities in the Republic of Bashkortostan bear this name:
Nikolsky, Ufa, Republic of Bashkortostan, a settlement in Novocherkassky Selsoviet of the city of republic significance of Ufa
Nikolsky, Birsk, Republic of Bashkortostan, a village under the administrative jurisdiction of the town of republic significance of Birsk
Nikolskoye, Aurgazinsky District, Republic of Bashkortostan, a selo in Ismagilovsky Selsoviet of Aurgazinsky District
Nikolskoye, Blagoveshchensky District, Republic of Bashkortostan, a village in Ilyino-Polyansky Selsoviet of Blagoveshchensky District
Nikolskoye, Buzdyaksky District, Republic of Bashkortostan, a selo in Gafuriysky Selsoviet of Buzdyaksky District
Nikolskoye, Krasnokamsky District, Republic of Bashkortostan, a selo in Nikolsky Selsoviet of Krasnokamsky District
Nikolskoye, Miyakinsky District, Republic of Bashkortostan, a village in Miyakinsky Selsoviet of Miyakinsky District
Nikolskoye, Nurimanovsky District, Republic of Bashkortostan, a selo in Nikolsky Selsoviet of Nurimanovsky District
Nikolskoye, Sterlibashevsky District, Republic of Bashkortostan, a village in Sterlibashevsky Selsoviet of Sterlibashevsky District

Belgorod Oblast
As of 2010, seven rural localities in Belgorod Oblast bear this name:
Nikolsky, Borisovsky District, Belgorod Oblast, a khutor in Khotmyzhsky Rural Okrug of Borisovsky District
Nikolsky, Korochansky District, Belgorod Oblast, a khutor in Korochansky District
Nikolsky, Krasnogvardeysky District, Belgorod Oblast, a settlement in Krasnogvardeysky District
Nikolsky, Rakityansky District, Belgorod Oblast, a khutor in Nizhnepensky Rural Okrug of Rakityansky District
Nikolskoye, Belgorodsky District, Belgorod Oblast, a selo in Belgorodsky District
Nikolskoye, Novooskolsky District, Belgorod Oblast, a selo in Novooskolsky District
Nikolskoye, Shebekinsky District, Belgorod Oblast, a selo in Shebekinsky District

Bryansk Oblast
As of 2010, four rural localities in Bryansk Oblast bear this name:
Nikolsky, Sevsky District, Bryansk Oblast, a settlement in Khinelsky Selsoviet of Sevsky District
Nikolsky, Surazhsky District, Bryansk Oblast, a settlement in Kulazhsky Selsoviet of Surazhsky District
Nikolsky, Vygonichsky District, Bryansk Oblast, a settlement under the administrative jurisdiction of Vygonichi Settlement Council of Vygonichsky District
Nikolsky, Zhiryatinsky District, Bryansk Oblast, a khutor in Zhiryatinsky Selsoviet of Zhiryatinsky District

Chelyabinsk Oblast
As of 2010, two rural localities in Chelyabinsk Oblast bear this name:
Nikolsky, Chelyabinsk Oblast, a settlement in Zlokazovsky Selsoviet of Kusinsky District
Nikolskoye, Chelyabinsk Oblast, a selo in Sokolovsky Selsoviet of Uysky District

Chuvash Republic
As of 2010, two rural localities in the Chuvash Republic bear this name:
Nikolskoye, Poretsky District, Chuvash Republic, a village in Siyavskoye Rural Settlement of Poretsky District
Nikolskoye, Yadrinsky District, Chuvash Republic, a selo in Ivankovskoye Rural Settlement of Yadrinsky District

Ivanovo Oblast
As of 2010, four rural localities in Ivanovo Oblast bear this name:
Nikolskoye, Furmanovsky District, Ivanovo Oblast, a selo in Furmanovsky District
Nikolskoye, Ilyinsky District, Ivanovo Oblast, a selo in Ilyinsky District
Nikolskoye, Ivanovsky District, Ivanovo Oblast, a selo in Ivanovsky District
Nikolskoye, Komsomolsky District, Ivanovo Oblast, a selo in Komsomolsky District

Kaliningrad Oblast
As of 2010, one rural locality in Kaliningrad Oblast bears this name:
Nikolskoye, Kaliningrad Oblast, a settlement in Alekseyevsky Rural Okrug of Krasnoznamensky District

Kaluga Oblast
As of 2010, thirteen rural localities in Kaluga Oblast bear this name:
Nikolsky, Kaluga Oblast, a settlement in Kuybyshevsky District
Nikolskoye, Babyninsky District, Kaluga Oblast, a selo in Babyninsky District
Nikolskoye (Starki Rural Settlement), Dzerzhinsky District, Kaluga Oblast, a village in Dzerzhinsky District; municipally, a part of Starki Rural Settlement of that district
Nikolskoye (Ugorskaya Rural Settlement), Dzerzhinsky District, Kaluga Oblast, a village in Dzerzhinsky District; municipally, a part of Ugorskaya Rural Settlement of that district
Nikolskoye, Ferzikovsky District, Kaluga Oblast, a village in Ferzikovsky District
Nikolskoye, Maloyaroslavetsky District, Kaluga Oblast, a village in Maloyaroslavetsky District
Nikolskoye, Medynsky District, Kaluga Oblast, a selo in Medynsky District
Nikolskoye, Meshchovsky District, Kaluga Oblast, a selo in Meshchovsky District
Nikolskoye (selo), Peremyshlsky District, Kaluga Oblast, a selo in Peremyshlsky District
Nikolskoye (village), Peremyshlsky District, Kaluga Oblast, a village in Peremyshlsky District
Nikolskoye, Spas-Demensky District, Kaluga Oblast, a village in Spas-Demensky District
Nikolskoye, Tarussky District, Kaluga Oblast, a village in Tarussky District
Nikolskoye, Zhukovsky District, Kaluga Oblast, a selo in Zhukovsky District

Kamchatka Krai
As of 2010, one rural locality in Kamchatka Krai bears this name:
Nikolskoye, Kamchatka Krai, a selo in Aleutsky District

Kirov Oblast
As of 2010, two rural localities in Kirov Oblast bear this name:
Nikolsky, Kirov Oblast, a pochinok in Krasnoyarsky Rural Okrug of Nolinsky District
Nikolskoye, Kirov Oblast, a village in Aryksky Rural Okrug of Malmyzhsky District

Kostroma Oblast
As of 2010, five rural localities in Kostroma Oblast bear this name:
Nikolskoye, Galichsky District, Kostroma Oblast, a village in Stepanovskoye Settlement of Galichsky District
Nikolskoye, Kotovskoye Settlement, Kostromskoy District, Kostroma Oblast, a village in Kotovskoye Settlement of Kostromskoy District
Nikolskoye, Nikolskoye Settlement, Kostromskoy District, Kostroma Oblast, a settlement in Nikolskoye Settlement of Kostromskoy District
Nikolskoye, Makaryevsky District, Kostroma Oblast, a settlement in Unzhenskoye Settlement of Makaryevsky District
Nikolskoye, Nerekhtsky District, Kostroma Oblast, a village in Volzhskoye Settlement of Nerekhtsky District

Krasnoyarsk Krai
As of 2010, three rural localities in Krasnoyarsk Krai bear this name:
Nikolskoye, Idrinsky District, Krasnoyarsk Krai, a selo in Nikolsky Selsoviet of Idrinsky District
Nikolskoye, Uyarsky District, Krasnoyarsk Krai, a selo in Roshchinsky Selsoviet of Uyarsky District
Nikolskoye, Yemelyanovsky District, Krasnoyarsk Krai, a selo in Nikolsky Selsoviet of Yemelyanovsky District

Kursk Oblast
As of 2010, eleven rural localities in Kursk Oblast bear this name:
Nikolsky, Kastorensky District, Kursk Oblast, a khutor in Alekseyevsky Selsoviet of Kastorensky District
Nikolsky, Kurchatovsky District, Kursk Oblast, a settlement in Nikolsky Selsoviet of Kurchatovsky District
Nikolsky, Shchigrovsky District, Kursk Oblast, a settlement in Nikolsky Selsoviet of Shchigrovsky District
Nikolsky, Sudzhansky District, Kursk Oblast, a khutor in Maloloknyansky Selsoviet of Sudzhansky District
Nikolsky, Zheleznogorsky District, Kursk Oblast, a settlement in Volkovsky Selsoviet of Zheleznogorsky District
Nikolskoye, Gorshechensky District, Kursk Oblast, a selo in Nikolsky Selsoviet of Gorshechensky District
Nikolskoye, Kastorensky District, Kursk Oblast, a selo in Alekseyevsky Selsoviet of Kastorensky District
Nikolskoye, Oktyabrsky District, Kursk Oblast, a selo in Nikolsky Selsoviet of Oktyabrsky District
Nikolskoye, Dobro-Kolodezsky Selsoviet, Solntsevsky District, Kursk Oblast, a selo in Dobro-Kolodezsky Selsoviet of Solntsevsky District
Nikolskoye, Ivanovsky Selsoviet, Solntsevsky District, Kursk Oblast, a selo in Ivanovsky Selsoviet of Solntsevsky District
Nikolskoye, Zolotukhinsky District, Kursk Oblast, a selo in Tazovsky Selsoviet of Zolotukhinsky District

Leningrad Oblast
As of 2010, seven inhabited localities in Leningrad Oblast bear this name.

Urban localities
Nikolskoye, Tosnensky District, Leningrad Oblast, a town in Tosnensky District
Nikolsky, Leningrad Oblast, an urban-type settlement in Nikolskoye Settlement Municipal Formation of Podporozhsky District

Rural localities
Nikolskoye, Boksitogorsky District, Leningrad Oblast, a village in Podborovskoye Settlement Municipal Formation of Boksitogorsky District
Nikolskoye, Bolshekolpanskoye Settlement Municipal Formation, Gatchinsky District, Leningrad Oblast, a slobodka in Bolshekolpanskoye Settlement Municipal Formation of Gatchinsky District
Nikolskoye, Vyritskoye Settlement Municipal Formation, Gatchinsky District, Leningrad Oblast, a village under the administrative jurisdiction of Vyritskoye Settlement Municipal Formation of Gatchinsky District
Nikolskoye, Kirovsky District, Leningrad Oblast, a village under the administrative jurisdiction of Naziyevskoye Settlement Municipal Formation of Kirovsky District
Nikolskoye, Lomonosovsky District, Leningrad Oblast, a village in Lopukhinskoye Settlement Municipal Formation of Lomonosovsky District

Lipetsk Oblast
As of 2010, fourteen rural localities in Lipetsk Oblast bear this name:
Nikolskoye, Bratovsky Selsoviet, Chaplyginsky District, Lipetsk Oblast, a village in Bratovsky Selsoviet of Chaplyginsky District
Nikolskoye, Troyekurovsky Selsoviet, Chaplyginsky District, Lipetsk Oblast, a selo in Troyekurovsky Selsoviet of Chaplyginsky District
Nikolskoye, Dankovsky District, Lipetsk Oblast, a selo in Bigildinsky Selsoviet of Dankovsky District
Nikolskoye, Dobrinsky District, Lipetsk Oblast, a selo in Khvorostyansky Selsoviet of Dobrinsky District
Nikolskoye, Dobrovsky District, Lipetsk Oblast, a village in Yekaterinovsky Selsoviet of Dobrovsky District
Nikolskoye, Izmalkovsky District, Lipetsk Oblast, a village in Petrovsky Selsoviet of Izmalkovsky District
Nikolskoye, Krasninsky District, Lipetsk Oblast, a selo in Sukhodolsky Selsoviet of Krasninsky District
Nikolskoye, Stebayevsky Selsoviet, Lipetsky District, Lipetsk Oblast, a selo in Stebayevsky Selsoviet of Lipetsky District
Nikolskoye, Vvedensky Selsoviet, Lipetsky District, Lipetsk Oblast, a selo in Vvedensky Selsoviet of Lipetsky District
Nikolskoye, Terbunsky District, Lipetsk Oblast, a village in Kazinsky Selsoviet of Terbunsky District
Nikolskoye, Usmansky District, Lipetsk Oblast, a selo in Nikolsky Selsoviet of Usmansky District
Nikolskoye, Naberezhansky Selsoviet, Volovsky District, Lipetsk Oblast, a village in Naberezhansky Selsoviet of Volovsky District
Nikolskoye, Ozhoginsky Selsoviet, Volovsky District, Lipetsk Oblast, a village in Ozhoginsky Selsoviet of Volovsky District
Nikolskoye, Zadonsky District, Lipetsk Oblast, a selo in Verkhnestudenetsky Selsoviet of Zadonsky District

Mari El Republic
As of 2010, one rural locality in the Mari El Republic bears this name:
Nikolsky, Mari El Republic, a pochinok in Korkatovsky Rural Okrug of Morkinsky District

Republic of Mordovia
As of 2010, one rural locality in the Republic of Mordovia bears this name:
Nikolskoye, Republic of Mordovia, a selo in Nikolsky Selsoviet of Torbeyevsky District

Moscow Oblast
As of 2010, eighteen rural localities in Moscow Oblast bear this name:
Nikolskoye, Iksha, Dmitrovsky District, Moscow Oblast, a village under the administrative jurisdiction of the work settlement of Iksha in Dmitrovsky District
Nikolskoye, Dmitrov, Dmitrovsky District, Moscow Oblast, a village under the administrative jurisdiction of the Town of Dmitrov in Dmitrovsky District
Nikolskoye, Istrinsky District, Moscow Oblast, a village in Yermolinskoye Rural Settlement of Istrinsky District
Nikolskoye, Klinsky District, Moscow Oblast, a village in Nudolskoye Rural Settlement of Klinsky District
Nikolskoye, Mozhaysky District, Moscow Oblast, a village in Poretskoye Rural Settlement of Mozhaysky District
Nikolskoye, Naro-Fominsky District, Moscow Oblast, a village in Veselevskoye Rural Settlement of Naro-Fominsky District
Nikolskoye, Nazaryevskoye Rural Settlement, Odintsovsky District, Moscow Oblast, a village in Nazaryevskoye Rural Settlement of Odintsovsky District
Nikolskoye, Nikolskoye Rural Settlement, Odintsovsky District, Moscow Oblast, a selo in Nikolskoye Rural Settlement of Odintsovsky District
Nikolskoye, Podolsky District, Moscow Oblast, a selo in Voronovskoye Rural Settlement of Podolsky District
Nikolskoye, Pushkinsky District, Moscow Oblast, a village under the administrative jurisdiction of the work settlement of Sofrino in Pushkinsky District
Nikolskoye, Kolyubakinskoye Rural Settlement, Ruzsky District, Moscow Oblast, a selo in Kolyubakinskoye Rural Settlement of Ruzsky District
Nikolskoye, Volkovskoye Rural Settlement, Ruzsky District, Moscow Oblast, a selo in Volkovskoye Rural Settlement of Ruzsky District
Nikolskoye, Serebryano-Prudsky District, Moscow Oblast, a village in Uzunovskoye Rural Settlement of Serebryano-Prudsky District
Nikolskoye, Shakhovskoy District, Moscow Oblast, a selo in Seredinskoye Rural Settlement of Shakhovskoy District
Nikolskoye, Solnechnogorsky District, Moscow Oblast, a village in Peshkovskoye Rural Settlement of Solnechnogorsky District
Nikolskoye, Volokolamsky District, Moscow Oblast, a village in Teryayevskoye Rural Settlement of Volokolamsky District
Nikolskoye, Voskresensky District, Moscow Oblast, a village in Ashitkovskoye Rural Settlement of Voskresensky District
Nikolskoye, Zaraysky District, Moscow Oblast, a village in Strupnenskoye Rural Settlement of Zaraysky District
Historic:
Nikolskoye, Pokrovsky Uyezd, Vladimir Governorate, incorporated into Orekhovo-Zuyevo 3 June, 1917

Nizhny Novgorod Oblast
As of 2010, ten rural localities in Nizhny Novgorod Oblast bear this name:
Nikolsky, Nizhny Novgorod Oblast, a settlement in Petrovsky Selsoviet of Pervomaysky District
Nikolskoye, Kantaurovsky Selsoviet, Bor, Nizhny Novgorod Oblast, a village in Kantaurovsky Selsoviet of the city of oblast significance of Bor
Nikolskoye, Lindovsky Selsoviet, Bor, Nizhny Novgorod Oblast, a village in Lindovsky Selsoviet of the city of oblast significance of Bor
Nikolskoye, Arzamassky District, Nizhny Novgorod Oblast, a selo in Balakhonikhinsky Selsoviet of Arzamassky District
Nikolskoye, Gaginsky District, Nizhny Novgorod Oblast, a selo in Yuryevsky Selsoviet of Gaginsky District
Nikolskoye, Brilyakovsky Selsoviet, Gorodetsky District, Nizhny Novgorod Oblast, a village in Brilyakovsky Selsoviet of Gorodetsky District
Nikolskoye, Smolkovsky Selsoviet, Gorodetsky District, Nizhny Novgorod Oblast, a village in Smolkovsky Selsoviet of Gorodetsky District
Nikolskoye, Lyskovsky District, Nizhny Novgorod Oblast, a selo in Lenkovsky Selsoviet of Lyskovsky District
Nikolskoye, Sokolsky District, Nizhny Novgorod Oblast, a village in Loyminsky Selsoviet of Sokolsky District
Nikolskoye, Vorotynsky District, Nizhny Novgorod Oblast, a village in Semyansky Selsoviet of Vorotynsky District

Novgorod Oblast
As of 2010, four rural localities in Novgorod Oblast bear this name:
Nikolskoye, Demyansky District, Novgorod Oblast, a selo in Pesotskoye Settlement of Demyansky District
Nikolskoye, Lyubytinsky District, Novgorod Oblast, a village under the administrative jurisdiction of the urban-type settlement of Lyubytino in Lyubytinsky District
Nikolskoye, Malovishersky District, Novgorod Oblast, a village in Burginskoye Settlement of Malovishersky District
Nikolskoye, Soletsky District, Novgorod Oblast, a village in Gorskoye Settlement of Soletsky District

Novosibirsk Oblast
As of 2010, one rural locality in Novosibirsk Oblast bears this name:
Nikolsky, Novosibirsk Oblast, a settlement under the administrative jurisdiction of  the work settlement of Gorny in Toguchinsky District

Omsk Oblast
As of 2010, one rural locality in Omsk Oblast bears this name:
Nikolskoye, Omsk Oblast, a selo in Nikolsky Rural Okrug of Tyukalinsky District

Orenburg Oblast
As of 2010, five rural localities in Orenburg Oblast bear this name:
Nikolskoye, Krasnogvardeysky District, Orenburg Oblast, a selo in Nikolsky Selsoviet of Krasnogvardeysky District
Nikolskoye, Kuvandyksky District, Orenburg Oblast, a selo in Krasnoznamensky Selsoviet of Kuvandyksky District
Nikolskoye, Orenburgsky District, Orenburg Oblast, a selo in Nikolsky Selsoviet of Orenburgsky District
Nikolskoye, Sakmarsky District, Orenburg Oblast, a selo in Nikolsky Selsoviet of Sakmarsky District
Nikolskoye, Sorochinsky District, Orenburg Oblast, a selo in Nikolayevsky Selsoviet of Sorochinsky District

Oryol Oblast
As of 2010, sixteen rural localities in Oryol Oblast bear this name:
Nikolsky, Bolkhovsky District, Oryol Oblast, a settlement in Odnolutsky Selsoviet of Bolkhovsky District
Nikolsky, Dmitrovsky District, Oryol Oblast, a settlement in Domakhovsky Selsoviet of Dmitrovsky District
Nikolsky, Verkhovsky District, Oryol Oblast, a settlement in Vasilyevsky Selsoviet of Verkhovsky District
Nikolsky, Zalegoshchensky District, Oryol Oblast, a settlement in Bortnovsky Selsoviet of Zalegoshchensky District
Nikolskoye, Dolzhansky District, Oryol Oblast, a selo in Kudinovsky Selsoviet of Dolzhansky District
Nikolskoye, Glazunovsky District, Oryol Oblast, a village in Ochkinsky Selsoviet of Glazunovsky District
Nikolskoye, Khotynetsky District, Oryol Oblast, a selo in Krasnoryabinsky Selsoviet of Khotynetsky District
Nikolskoye, Kolpnyansky District, Oryol Oblast, a village in Belokolodezsky Selsoviet of Kolpnyansky District
Nikolskoye, Livensky District, Oryol Oblast, a selo in Nikolsky Selsoviet of Livensky District
Nikolskoye, Maloarkhangelsky District, Oryol Oblast, a selo in Leninsky Selsoviet of Maloarkhangelsky District
Nikolskoye, Mtsensky District, Oryol Oblast, a village in Alyabyevsky Selsoviet of Mtsensky District
Nikolskoye, Novoderevenkovsky District, Oryol Oblast, a village in Novoderevenkovsky Selsoviet of Novoderevenkovsky District
Nikolskoye, Pokrovsky District, Oryol Oblast, a village in Topkovsky Selsoviet of Pokrovsky District
Nikolskoye, Sverdlovsky District, Oryol Oblast, a selo in Nikolsky Selsoviet of Sverdlovsky District
Nikolskoye, Trosnyansky District, Oryol Oblast, a selo in Nikolsky Selsoviet of Trosnyansky District
Nikolskoye, Verkhovsky District, Oryol Oblast, a village in Korsunsky Selsoviet of Verkhovsky District

Penza Oblast
As of 2010, six rural localities in Penza Oblast bear this name:
Nikolskoye, Bekovsky District, Penza Oblast, a selo in Ivanovsky Selsoviet of Bekovsky District
Nikolskoye, Bessonovsky District, Penza Oblast, a village in Sosnovsky Selsoviet of Bessonovsky District
Nikolskoye, Kuznetsky District, Penza Oblast, a selo in Nikolsky Selsoviet of Kuznetsky District
Nikolskoye, Lopatinsky District, Penza Oblast, a selo in Vereshimsky Selsoviet of Lopatinsky District
Nikolskoye, Tamalinsky District, Penza Oblast, a selo in Vishnevsky Selsoviet of Tamalinsky District
Nikolskoye, Zemetchinsky District, Penza Oblast, a village in Morsovsky Selsoviet of Zemetchinsky District

Perm Krai
As of 2010, two rural localities in Perm Krai bear this name:
Nikolskoye, Perm Krai, a selo in Karagaysky District
Nikolskaya, Perm Krai, a village in Sivinsky District

Pskov Oblast
As of 2010, two rural localities in Pskov Oblast bear this name:
Nikolskoye, Bezhanitsky District, Pskov Oblast, a village in Bezhanitsky District
Nikolskoye, Kunyinsky District, Pskov Oblast, a village in Kunyinsky District

Rostov Oblast
As of 2010, three rural localities in Rostov Oblast bear this name:
Nikolsky, Rostov Oblast, a khutor in Nikolskoye Rural Settlement of Zavetinsky District
Nikolskoye, Rostov Oblast, a selo in Novobessergenevskoye Rural Settlement of Neklinovsky District
Nikolskaya, Rostov Oblast, a sloboda in Olkhovo-Rogskoye Rural Settlement of Millerovsky District

Ryazan Oblast
As of 2010, four rural localities in Ryazan Oblast bear this name:
Nikolsky, Ryazan Oblast, a settlement in Karl-Marksovsky Rural Okrug of Sarayevsky District
Nikolskoye, Alexandro-Nevsky District, Ryazan Oblast, a selo in Nizhneyakimetsky Rural Okrug of Alexandro-Nevsky District
Nikolskoye, Ryazansky District, Ryazan Oblast, a selo in Semenovsky Rural Okrug of Ryazansky District
Nikolskoye, Sapozhkovsky District, Ryazan Oblast, a selo in Nikolsky Rural Okrug of Sapozhkovsky District

Sakha Republic
As of 2010, one rural locality in the Sakha Republic bears this name:
Nikolsky, Sakha Republic, a selo in Nikolsky Rural Okrug of Namsky District

Sakhalin Oblast
As of 2010, one rural locality in Sakhalin Oblast bears this name:
Nikolskoye, Sakhalin Oblast, a selo in Uglegorsky District

Samara Oblast
As of 2010, three rural localities in Samara Oblast bear this name:
Nikolsky, Bogatovsky District, Samara Oblast, a settlement in Bogatovsky District
Nikolsky, Isaklinsky District, Samara Oblast, a settlement in Isaklinsky District
Nikolskoye, Samara Oblast, a selo in Bezenchuksky District

Saratov Oblast
As of 2010, five rural localities in Saratov Oblast bear this name:
Nikolsky, Saratov Oblast, a railway crossing loop in Tatishchevsky District
Nikolskoye, Bazarno-Karabulaksky District, Saratov Oblast, a selo in Bazarno-Karabulaksky District
Nikolskoye, Dukhovnitsky District, Saratov Oblast, a selo in Dukhovnitsky District
Nikolskoye, Fyodorovsky District, Saratov Oblast, a selo in Fyodorovsky District
Nikolskoye, Volsky District, Saratov Oblast, a selo in Volsky District

Smolensk Oblast
As of 2010, seven rural localities in Smolensk Oblast bear this name:
Nikolskoye, Gagarinsky District, Smolensk Oblast, a village in Nikolskoye Rural Settlement of Gagarinsky District
Nikolskoye, Novoduginsky District, Smolensk Oblast, a village in Vysokovskoye Rural Settlement of Novoduginsky District
Nikolskoye, Roslavlsky District, Smolensk Oblast, a village in Lesnikovskoye Rural Settlement of Roslavlsky District
Nikolskoye, Smolensky District, Smolensk Oblast, a village in Korokhotkinskoye Rural Settlement of Smolensky District
Nikolskoye, Sychyovsky District, Smolensk Oblast, a village in Nikolskoye Rural Settlement of Sychyovsky District
Nikolskoye, Polyanovskoye Rural Settlement, Vyazemsky District, Smolensk Oblast, a village in Polyanovskoye Rural Settlement of Vyazemsky District
Nikolskoye, Zavodskoye Rural Settlement, Vyazemsky District, Smolensk Oblast, a village in Zavodskoye Rural Settlement of Vyazemsky District

Stavropol Krai
As of 2010, one rural locality in Stavropol Krai bears this name:
Nikolskoye, Stavropol Krai, a selo in Varenikovsky Selsoviet of Stepnovsky District

Sverdlovsk Oblast
As of 2010, three rural localities in Sverdlovsk Oblast bear this name:
Nikolsky, Sverdlovsk Oblast, a settlement under the administrative jurisdiction of the Town of Krasnouralsk
Nikolskoye, Kamyshlovsky District, Sverdlovsk Oblast, a selo in Kamyshlovsky District
Nikolskoye, Sysertsky District, Sverdlovsk Oblast, a selo in Sysertsky District

Tambov Oblast
As of 2015, eleven rural localities in Tambov Oblast bear this name:
Nikolsky, Tambov Oblast, a settlement in Pervomaysky Selsoviet of Sampursky District
Nikolskoye, Gavrilovsky District, Tambov Oblast, a village in Osino-Gaysky Selsoviet of Gavrilovsky District
Nikolskoye, Michurinsky District, Tambov Oblast, a selo in Glazkovsky Selsoviet of Michurinsky District
Nikolskoye, Mordovsky District, Tambov Oblast, a village in Shulginsky Selsoviet of Mordovsky District
Nikolskoye, Nikiforovsky District, Tambov Oblast, a selo in Yurlovsky Selsoviet of Nikiforovsky District
Nikolskoye, Pervomaysky District, Tambov Oblast, a selo in Novoseslavinsky Selsoviet of Pervomaysky District
Nikolskoye, Novositovsky Selsoviet, Petrovsky District, Tambov Oblast, a settlement in Novositovsky Selsoviet of Petrovsky District
Nikolskoye, Rakhmaninsky Selsoviet, Petrovsky District, Tambov Oblast, a village in Rakhmaninsky Selsoviet of Petrovsky District
Nikolskoye, Rasskazovsky District, Tambov Oblast, a selo in Nikolsky Selsoviet of Rasskazovsky District
Nikolskoye, Znamensky District, Tambov Oblast, a selo in Nikolsky Selsoviet of Znamensky District
Nikolskaya, Tambov Oblast, a village in Leninsky Selsoviet of Mordovsky District

Republic of Tatarstan
As of 2010, four rural localities in the Republic of Tatarstan bear this name:
Nikolsky, Republic of Tatarstan, a settlement in Verkhneuslonsky District
Nikolskoye, Laishevsky District, Republic of Tatarstan, a selo in Laishevsky District
Nikolskoye, Spassky District, Republic of Tatarstan, a selo in Spassky District
Nikolskoye, Zelenodolsky District, Republic of Tatarstan, a village in Zelenodolsky District

Tomsk Oblast
As of 2010, one rural locality in Tomsk Oblast bears this name:
Nikolskoye, Tomsk Oblast, a selo in Krivosheinsky District

Tula Oblast
As of 2010, thirteen rural localities in Tula Oblast bear this name:
Nikolsky, Tula Oblast, a settlement in Bolsheplotavsky Rural Okrug of Yefremovsky District
Nikolskoye, Dyakovskaya Rural Administration, Chernsky District, Tula Oblast, a village in Dyakovskaya Rural Administration of Chernsky District
Nikolskoye, Nikolskaya Rural Administration, Chernsky District, Tula Oblast, a village in Nikolskaya Rural Administration of Chernsky District
Nikolskoye, Kireyevsky District, Tula Oblast, a village in Bolshekalmyksky Rural Okrug of Kireyevsky District
Nikolskoye, Kurkinsky District, Tula Oblast, a selo in Sergiyevskaya Volost of Kurkinsky District
Nikolskoye, Odoyevsky District, Tula Oblast, a village in Stoyanovskaya Rural Administration of Odoyevsky District
Nikolskoye, Plavsky District, Tula Oblast, a village in Meshcherinsky Rural Okrug of Plavsky District
Nikolskoye, Shchyokinsky District, Tula Oblast, a selo in Nikolskaya Rural Administration of Shchyokinsky District
Nikolskoye, Uzlovsky District, Tula Oblast, a village in Nikolskaya Rural Administration of Uzlovsky District
Nikolskoye, Yasnogorsky District, Tula Oblast, a village in Taydakovskaya Rural Territory of Yasnogorsky District
Nikolskoye, Oktyabrsky Rural Okrug, Yefremovsky District, Tula Oblast, a village in Oktyabrsky Rural Okrug of Yefremovsky District
Nikolskoye, Shkilevsky Rural Okrug, Yefremovsky District, Tula Oblast, a selo in Shkilevsky Rural Okrug of Yefremovsky District
Nikolskoye, Zaoksky District, Tula Oblast, a village under the administrative jurisdiction of the urban-type settlement of Zaoksky in Zaoksky District

Tver Oblast
As of 2010, twenty-one rural localities in Tver Oblast bear this name:
Nikolskoye, Kalininsky District, Tver Oblast, a selo in Kalininsky District
Nikolskoye (selo), Kashinsky District, Tver Oblast, a selo in Kashinsky District
Nikolskoye (village), Kashinsky District, Tver Oblast, a village in Kashinsky District
Nikolskoye (Nikolskoye Rural Settlement), Kesovogorsky District, Tver Oblast, a village in Kesovogorsky District; municipally, a part of Nikolskoye Rural Settlement of that district
Nikolskoye (Strelikhinskoye Rural Settlement), Kesovogorsky District, Tver Oblast, a village in Kesovogorsky District; municipally, a part of Strelikhinskoye Rural Settlement of that district
Nikolskoye (Pervomayskoye Rural Settlement), Konakovsky District, Tver Oblast, a village in Konakovsky District; municipally, a part of Pervomayskoye Rural Settlement of that district
Nikolskoye (Dmitrovogorskoye Rural Settlement), Konakovsky District, Tver Oblast, a village in Konakovsky District; municipally, a part of Dmitrovogorskoye Rural Settlement of that district
Nikolskoye, Lesnoy District, Tver Oblast, a selo in Lesnoy District
Nikolskoye (Seletskoye Rural Settlement), Maksatikhinsky District, Tver Oblast, a village in Maksatikhinsky District; municipally, a part of Seletskoye Rural Settlement of that district
Nikolskoye (Zarechenskoye Rural Settlement), Maksatikhinsky District, Tver Oblast, a village in Maksatikhinsky District; municipally, a part of Zarechenskoye Rural Settlement of that district
Nikolskoye, Molokovsky District, Tver Oblast, a village in Molokovsky District
Nikolskoye, Ostashkovsky District, Tver Oblast, a village in Ostashkovsky District
Nikolskoye, Rameshkovsky District, Tver Oblast, a selo in Rameshkovsky District
Nikolskoye, Sandovsky District, Tver Oblast, a village in Sandovsky District
Nikolskoye (Lukovnikovskoye Rural Settlement), Staritsky District, Tver Oblast, a village in Staritsky District; municipally, a part of Lukovnikovskoye Rural Settlement of that district
Nikolskoye (Novo-Yamskoye Rural Settlement), Staritsky District, Tver Oblast, a village in Staritsky District; municipally, a part of Novo-Yamskoye Rural Settlement of that district
Nikolskoye (Stepurinskoye Rural Settlement), Staritsky District, Tver Oblast, a village in Staritsky District; municipally, a part of Stepurinskoye Rural Settlement of that district
Nikolskoye (Stepurinskoye Rural Settlement), Staritsky District, Tver Oblast, a village in Staritsky District; municipally, a part of Stepurinskoye Rural Settlement of that district
Nikolskoye, Toropetsky District, Tver Oblast, a village in Toropetsky District
Nikolskoye, Torzhoksky District, Tver Oblast, a selo in Torzhoksky District
Nikolskoye, Zubtsovsky District, Tver Oblast, a village in Zubtsovsky District

Tyumen Oblast
As of 2010, two rural localities in Tyumen Oblast bear this name:
Nikolsky, Tyumen Oblast, a settlement in Karasulsky Rural Okrug of Ishimsky District
Nikolskaya, Tyumen Oblast, a village in Novoaleksandrovsky Rural Okrug of Yarkovsky District

Udmurt Republic
As of 2010, three rural localities in the Udmurt Republic bear this name:
Nikolsky, Udmurt Republic, a pochinok in Bolgurinsky Selsoviet of Votkinsky District
Nikolskoye, Yarsky District, Udmurt Republic, a selo in Nikolsky Selsoviet of Yarsky District
Nikolskoye, Zavyalovsky District, Udmurt Republic, a village in Babinsky Selsoviet of Zavyalovsky District

Ulyanovsk Oblast
As of 2010, two rural localities in Ulyanovsk Oblast bear this name:
Nikolskoye, Kuzovatovsky District, Ulyanovsk Oblast, a selo in Yedelevsky Rural Okrug of Kuzovatovsky District
Nikolskoye, Sengileyevsky District, Ulyanovsk Oblast, a selo in Yelaursky Rural Okrug of Sengileyevsky District

Vladimir Oblast
As of 2010, two rural localities in Vladimir Oblast bear this name:
Nikolskoye, Alexandrovsky District, Vladimir Oblast, a village in Alexandrovsky District
Nikolskoye, Sudogodsky District, Vladimir Oblast, a village in Sudogodsky District

Vologda Oblast
As of 2010, nineteen rural localities in Vologda Oblast bear this name:
Nikolskoye, Babayevsky District, Vologda Oblast, a village in Volkovsky Selsoviet of Babayevsky District
Nikolskoye, Cherepovetsky District, Vologda Oblast, a selo in Abakanovsky Selsoviet of Cherepovetsky District
Nikolskoye, Ploskovsky Selsoviet, Gryazovetsky District, Vologda Oblast, a village in Ploskovsky Selsoviet of Gryazovetsky District
Nikolskoye, Vokhtogsky Selsoviet, Gryazovetsky District, Vologda Oblast, a village in Vokhtogsky Selsoviet of Gryazovetsky District
Nikolskoye, Kaduysky District, Vologda Oblast, a selo in Nikolsky Selsoviet of Kaduysky District
Nikolskoye, Kirillovsky District, Vologda Oblast, a selo in Ivanovoborsky Selsoviet of Kirillovsky District
Nikolskoye, Mezhdurechensky District, Vologda Oblast, a village in Sheybukhtovsky Selsoviet of Mezhdurechensky District
Nikolskoye, Argunovsky Selsoviet, Nikolsky District, Vologda Oblast, a village in Argunovsky Selsoviet of Nikolsky District
Nikolskoye, Nizhnekemsky Selsoviet, Nikolsky District, Vologda Oblast, a selo in Nizhnekemsky Selsoviet of Nikolsky District
Nikolskoye, Sheksninsky District, Vologda Oblast, a village in Yershovsky Selsoviet of Sheksninsky District
Nikolskoye, Sokolsky District, Vologda Oblast, a village in Chuchkovsky Selsoviet of Sokolsky District
Nikolskoye, Syamzhensky District, Vologda Oblast, a village in Zhityevsky Selsoviet of Syamzhensky District
Nikolskoye, Totemsky District, Vologda Oblast, a selo in Nikolsky Selsoviet of Totemsky District
Nikolskoye, Ust-Kubinsky District, Vologda Oblast, a selo in Nikolsky Selsoviet of Ust-Kubinsky District
Nikolskoye, Vashkinsky District, Vologda Oblast, a village in Pokrovsky Selsoviet of Vashkinsky District
Nikolskaya, Sokolsky District, Vologda Oblast, a village in Biryakovsky Selsoviet of Sokolsky District
Nikolskaya, Vashkinsky District, Vologda Oblast, a village in Roksomsky Selsoviet of Vashkinsky District
Nikolskaya, Verkhovazhsky District, Vologda Oblast, a village in Olyushinsky Selsoviet of Verkhovazhsky District
Nikolskaya, Vozhegodsky District, Vologda Oblast, a village in Lipino-Kalikinsky Selsoviet of Vozhegodsky District

Voronezh Oblast
As of 2010, ten rural localities in Voronezh Oblast bear this name:
Nikolsky, Ertilsky District, Voronezh Oblast, a settlement under the administrative jurisdiction of Ertilskoye Urban Settlement of Ertilsky District
Nikolsky, Liskinsky District, Voronezh Oblast, a khutor in Zaluzhenskoye Rural Settlement of Liskinsky District
Nikolsky, Podgorensky District, Voronezh Oblast, a khutor in Skororybskoye Rural Settlement of Podgorensky District
Nikolskoye, Voronezh, Voronezh Oblast, a selo under the administrative jurisdiction of Voronezh Urban Okrug
Nikolskoye, Anninsky District, Voronezh Oblast, a selo in Nikolskoye Rural Settlement of Anninsky District
Nikolskoye, Novousmansky District, Voronezh Oblast, a settlement in Rozhdestvensko-Khavskoye Rural Settlement of Novousmansky District
Nikolskoye, Paninsky District, Voronezh Oblast, a selo in Progressovskoye Rural Settlement of Paninsky District
Nikolskoye, Semiluksky District, Voronezh Oblast, a selo in Nizhnevedugskoye Rural Settlement of Semiluksky District
Nikolskoye, Talovsky District, Voronezh Oblast, a selo in Nikolskoye Rural Settlement of Talovsky District
Nikolskoye, Verkhnekhavsky District, Voronezh Oblast, a settlement in Maloprivalovskoye Rural Settlement of Verkhnekhavsky District

Yaroslavl Oblast
As of 2010, sixteen rural localities in Yaroslavl Oblast bear this name:
Nikolskoye, Bolsheselsky District, Yaroslavl Oblast, a selo in Bolsheselsky Rural Okrug of Bolsheselsky District
Nikolskoye, Breytovsky District, Yaroslavl Oblast, a village in Filimonovsky Rural Okrug of Breytovsky District
Nikolskoye, Danilovsky District, Yaroslavl Oblast, a selo in Nikolsky Rural Okrug of Danilovsky District
Nikolskoye, Lyubimsky District, Yaroslavl Oblast, a selo in Osetsky Rural Okrug of Lyubimsky District
Nikolskoye, Latskovsky Rural Okrug, Nekouzsky District, Yaroslavl Oblast, a village in Latskovsky Rural Okrug of Nekouzsky District
Nikolskoye, Shestikhinsky Rural Okrug, Nekouzsky District, Yaroslavl Oblast, a village in Shestikhinsky Rural Okrug of Nekouzsky District
Nikolskoye, Nekrasovsky District, Yaroslavl Oblast, a selo in Nikolsky Rural Okrug of Nekrasovsky District
Nikolskoye, Pereslavsky District, Yaroslavl Oblast, a village in Dubrovitsky Rural Okrug of Pereslavsky District
Nikolskoye, Leninsky Rural Okrug, Poshekhonsky District, Yaroslavl Oblast, a village in Leninsky Rural Okrug of Poshekhonsky District
Nikolskoye, Yermakovsky Rural Okrug, Poshekhonsky District, Yaroslavl Oblast, a village in Yermakovsky Rural Okrug of Poshekhonsky District
Nikolskoye, Rostovsky District, Yaroslavl Oblast, a selo in Nikolsky Rural Okrug of Rostovsky District
Nikolskoye, Nikolo-Kormsky Rural Okrug, Rybinsky District, Yaroslavl Oblast, a selo in Nikolo-Kormsky Rural Okrug of Rybinsky District
Nikolskoye, Volzhsky Rural Okrug, Rybinsky District, Yaroslavl Oblast, a village in Volzhsky Rural Okrug of Rybinsky District
Nikolskoye, Fominsky Rural Okrug, Tutayevsky District, Yaroslavl Oblast, a village in Fominsky Rural Okrug of Tutayevsky District
Nikolskoye, Nikolsky Rural Okrug, Tutayevsky District, Yaroslavl Oblast, a selo in Nikolsky Rural Okrug of Tutayevsky District
Nikolskoye, Uglichsky District, Yaroslavl Oblast, a selo in Nikolsky Rural Okrug of Uglichsky District

Abolished localities
Nikolskoye, Rzhaksinsky District, Tambov Oblast, a former rural locality (a village) in Zolotovsky Selsoviet of Rzhaksinsky District in Tambov Oblast; merged into the selo of Zolotovka in November 2014

See also
Nikolsk